"Middle America" is a song by American rock band Stephen Malkmus and the Jicks. It is the fifth track and first single from their seventh studio album, Sparkle Hard, and was released as a digital single on February 7, 2018 by Matador Records and Domino Records.

Composition and lyrics
Described as an "ode to underdogs everywhere", the song features lyrics concerning the passage of time and aging contrasted with smaller concepts of getting "shitfaced" and blushing the color of Robitussin. The song also features the lyric "Men are scum, I won’t deny", which has been interpreted as a reference to the #MeToo movement. Writing for Paste Magazine, Scott Russell compared the song's folksy, sunny sound and existential lyrics to that of "Range Life" by Pavement.

In an interview with Stereogum, Malkmus explained the song's title: "I have no judgments on middle America. That was a working title, I just kinda kept it." Stereogum interpreted the title and the song itself as engaging with the "ennui of the flyover states."

Music video
A music video for an acoustic version of the song was released on March 7, 2018. Directed by Brook Linder, it consists solely of Stephen Malkmus sitting in an alcove in front of a windowpane and surrounded by houseplants, strumming an acoustic guitar and singing. The video's simplicity was praised by Pitchfork, who included it in their list of best music videos of March 2018.

Critical reception
Pitchfork praised "Middle America" and awarded it Best New Track upon its release. Sasha Geffen stated: "Malkmus and the Jicks' new song, “Middle America,” fully exploits their frontman's ability to hook his voice around an irresistible melody, then another, then another. Any of the vocal bars from “Middle America” could be another song's sole refrain, but Malkmus links them all together like he’ll never have to worry about running out of catchy moments—like he produces them effortlessly, in abundance."

Jon Dolan of Rolling Stone called the song the "sweetest moment" of Sparkle Hard, writing, "It’s Malkmus at his most straightforwardly graceful, strumming a folkie melody like a guy in his backyard figuring life out at his own easeful pace, balancing everyday worry (“time gets me and I wonder how to simplify”) with goofy sweet nothings (“kiss yourself metaphorically”), capping it off with a aphoristic #metoo toast: “Men are scum, I can’t deny/May you be shitfaced the day you die.” Words to live by for sure."

Writing for The Guardian, Dave Simpson called the song one of Malkmus' "sweetest melodies".

Year-end lists

References

External links

2018 singles
2018 songs
Domino Recording Company singles
Matador Records singles
Songs written by Stephen Malkmus
Stephen Malkmus and the Jicks songs